The World Rookie Tour (WRT) is the largest action sport youth series in the world and it is organized by the Black Yeti ssrl in collaboration with International and National Sports Associations. It consists of a selection of high quality International events, in snowboard, freeski and skateboard, the so called “Rookie Fests”, reserved for riders under 18’s only, in Europe, North and South America, Oceania and Asia. The World Rookie Tour consists not only of competitions: it also features loads of other activities to help rookies to grow in the field of professional snowboarding, such as photo & video shootings, avalanche and rescue clinics, meetings with photographers and international team managers, parties and English talks. Since year zero it awards tickets to world class events such as The Arctic Challenge, The Air & Style, the X Games, the Audi Nines, Red Bull Roller Coaster, Simple Session, Mystic Cup, invitations to professional snowboard photo & video shootings, and freeride trip in Chile. Every year the tour crowns the World Rookie Champion at the end of season, at the World Rookie Finals, a unique event where the best youngsters from almost 30 countries compete and have fun. More information at www.worldrookietour.com

External links 
Official website worldrookietour.com

References

Snowboarding